Matosinhos e Leça da Palmeira is a civil parish in the municipality of Matosinhos, Northern Portugal. It was formed in 2013 by the merger of the former parishes Matosinhos and Leça da Palmeira. The population in 2011 was 49,486, in an area of 12.16 km².

History

It was founded in 2013, as part of a national administrative reform, by the aggregation of the former parishes of Matosinhos and Leça da Palmeira and has its headquarters in Matosinhos.

References

Freguesias of Matosinhos